Dactylicapnos (climbing dicentra; formerly included in Dicentra) is a genus of frost-tender perennial or annual climbers native to the Himalayas, northern Burma, central southern China, and northern Vietnam.

Description
Leaves are compound, with leaflets arranged in threes (perennial species) or pinnately (mostly annuals). The leaflet at the end of each leaf is transformed into a branched tendril.

Flowers are heart-shaped and have four pale yellow to orange petals. The outer petals are pouched at the base and bent slightly outwards at the tip.

The fruit is a capsule with two valves, dehiscent in most species, but indehiscent in D. scandens.

References

 Bleeding hearts, Corydalis, and their relatives. Mark Tebbitt, Magnus Lidén, and Henrik Zetterlund. Timber Press. 2008. — Google Books

External links

Fumarioideae
Papaveraceae genera